Mark Carhart is a finance researcher and a science man and quantitative investment manager known for extending the Fama–French three-factor model with a momentum factor. He is currently chief investment officer of New York quantitative hedge fund, Kepos Capital

References

People in finance
Living people
Year of birth missing (living people)
Place of birth missing (living people)
Goldman Sachs people